The Nobel Committee for Physics is the Nobel Committee responsible for proposing laureates for the Nobel Prize for Physics. The Nobel Committee for Physics is appointed by the Royal Swedish Academy of Sciences. It usually consists of Swedish professors of physics who are members of the Academy, although the Academy in principle could appoint anyone to the Committee.

The Committee is a working body without decision power, and the final decision to award the Nobel Prize for Physics is taken by the entire Royal Swedish Academy of Sciences, after having a first discussion in the Academy's Class for Physics.

Current members 
The members of the Committee (as of 2022) are:

 David Haviland
 John Wettlaufer 
 Eva Olsson
 Thors Hans Hansson 
 Anders Irbäck (Chair)
 Ulf Danielsson(Secretary)

Co-opted members 

 Mats Larsson
 Ellen Moons
 Gunnar Ingelman

Secretary 
The secretary takes part in the meeting, but cannot cast a vote unless the secretary is also a member of the Committee. Until 1973, the Nobel Committees for Physics and Chemistry had a common secretary. 

 Wilhelm Palmær, 1900–1926
 Arne Westgren, 1926–1943
 Arne Ölander, 1943–1965
 Arne Magnéli, 1966–1973
 Bengt Nagel, 1974–1988 
 Anders Bárány, 1989–2003 
 Lars Bergström, 2004–2015
 Gunnar Ingelman, 2016–present

Former members 
 Hugo Hildebrand Hildebrandsson, 1900–1910
 Robert Thalén, 1900–1903
 Klas Bernhard Hasselberg, 1900–1922
 Knut Ångström, 1900–1909
 Svante Arrhenius, 1900–1927
 Gustaf Granqvist, 1904–1922
 Vilhelm Carlheim-Gyllensköld, 1910–1934
 Allvar Gullstrand, 1911–1929
 Carl Wilhelm Oseen, 1923–1944
 Manne Siegbahn, 1923–1961 (chairman ?–1957)
 Henning Pleijel, 1928–1947
 Erik Hulthén, 1929–1962 (chairman 1958–1962)
 Axel E. Lindh, 1935–1960
 Ivar Waller, 1945–1972
 Gustaf Ising, 1947–1953
 Oskar Klein, 1954–1965
 Bengt Edlén, 1961–1976
 Erik Rudberg, 1963–1972 (chairman 1963–1972)
 Kai Siegbahn, 1963–1974 (chairman 1973–1974)
 Lamek Hulthén, 1966–1979 (chairman 1975–1979)
 Per-Olov Löwdin, 1972–1984
 A.M. Harun-ar-Rashid, 1972, 1986, 1993
 Stig Lundqvist, 1973–1985 (chairman 1980–1985)
 Sven Johansson, 1975–1986 (chairman 1986)
 Gösta Ekspong, 1975–1988 (chairman 1987–1988)
 Ingvar Lindgren, 1978–1991 (chairman 1989–1991)
 Carl Nordling, 1985–1997 (chairman 1992–1995)
 Bengt Nagel, 1986–1997
 Erik Karlsson, 1987–1998 (chairman 1997–1998)
 Cecilia Jarlskog, 1989–2000 (chairman 1999–2000)
 Tord Claeson, 1992–2000 
 Mats Jonson, 1997–2005
 Sune Svanberg, 1998–2006 
 Per Carlson, 1999–2007
 Lennart Stenflo, 2001–2006
 Joseph Nordgren, 2001–2009 (chairman 2008–2009)
 Ingemar Lundström, 2006–? (chairman 2010–?)
 Anne L'Huillier, 2007–2015
 Börje Johansson, 2007–?
 Lars Brink, 2008–?
 Björn Jonson, 2006–present 
 Per Delsing, 2007–2015
 Olle Inganäs, 2012–2016 
 Nils Mårtensson, around 2017 (chair)
 Olga Botner, 2010–2018

References 

Nobel Prize in Physics
Royal Swedish Academy of Sciences
Awards juries and committees